The C preprocessor is the macro preprocessor for the C, Objective-C and C++ computer programming languages. The preprocessor provides the ability for the inclusion of header files, macro expansions, conditional compilation, and line control.

In many C implementations, it is a separate program invoked by the compiler as the first part of translation.

The language of preprocessor directives is only weakly related to the grammar of C, and so is sometimes used to process other kinds of text files.

History 
The preprocessor was introduced to C around 1973 at the urging of Alan Snyder and also in recognition of the usefulness of the file-inclusion mechanisms available in BCPL and PL/I. Its original version offered only file inclusion and simple string replacement using #include and #define for parameterless macros, respectively. It was extended shortly after, firstly by Mike Lesk and then by John Reiser, to incorporate macros with arguments and conditional compilation.

The C preprocessor was part of a long macro-language tradition at Bell Labs, which was started by Douglas Eastwood and Douglas McIlroy in 1959.

Phases 
Preprocessing is defined by the first four (of eight) phases of translation specified in the C Standard.

 Trigraph replacement: The preprocessor replaces trigraph sequences with the characters they represent.
 Line splicing: Physical source lines that are continued with escaped newline sequences are spliced to form logical lines.
 Tokenization: The preprocessor breaks the result into preprocessing tokens and whitespace.  It replaces comments with whitespace.
 Macro expansion and directive handling: Preprocessing directive lines, including file inclusion and conditional compilation, are executed.  The preprocessor simultaneously expands macros and, since the 1999 version of the C standard, handles _Pragma operators.

Including files 

One of the most common uses of the preprocessor is to include another file:

#include <stdio.h>

int main(void)
{
    printf("Hello, World!\n");
    return 0;
}

The preprocessor replaces the line #include <stdio.h> with the textual content of the file 'stdio.h', which declares the printf() function among other things.

This can also be written using double quotes, e.g. #include "stdio.h". If the filename is enclosed within angle brackets, the file is searched for in the standard compiler include paths. If the filename is enclosed within double quotes, the search path is expanded to include the current source file directory. C compilers and programming environments all have a facility that allows the programmer to define where include files can be found. This can be introduced through a command-line flag, which can be parameterized using a makefile, so that a different set of include files can be swapped in for different operating systems, for instance.

By convention, include files are named with either a .h or .hpp extension. However, there is no requirement that this is observed. Files with a .def extension may denote files designed to be included multiple times, each time expanding the same repetitive content; #include "icon.xbm" is likely to refer to an XBM image file (which is at the same time a C source file).

#include often compels the use of #include guards or #pragma once to prevent double inclusion.

Conditional compilation 

#if VERBOSE >= 2
  printf("trace message");
#endif

Most compilers targeting Microsoft Windows implicitly define _WIN32. This allows code, including preprocessor commands, to compile only when targeting Windows systems. A few compilers define WIN32 instead. For such compilers that do not implicitly define the _WIN32 macro, it can be specified on the compiler's command line, using -D_WIN32.

#ifdef __unix__ /* __unix__ is usually defined by compilers targeting Unix systems */
# include <unistd.h>
#elif defined _WIN32 /* _WIN32 is usually defined by compilers targeting 32 or 64 bit Windows systems */
# include <windows.h>
#endif

The example code tests if a macro __unix__ is defined. If it is, the file <unistd.h> is then included. Otherwise, it tests if a macro _WIN32 is defined instead. If it is, the file <windows.h> is then included.

A more complex #if example can use operators, for example something like:

#if !(defined __LP64__ || defined __LLP64__) || defined _WIN32 && !defined _WIN64
	// we are compiling for a 32-bit system
#else
	// we are compiling for a 64-bit system
#endif

Translation can also be caused to fail by using the #error directive:

#if RUBY_VERSION == 190
#error 1.9.0 not supported
#endif

Macro definition and expansion 

There are two types of macros, object-like and function-like. Object-like macros do not take parameters; function-like macros do (although the list of parameters may be empty). The generic syntax for declaring an identifier as a macro of each type is, respectively:

#define <identifier> <replacement token list>                    // object-like macro
#define <identifier>(<parameter list>) <replacement token list>  // function-like macro, note parameters

The function-like macro declaration must not have any whitespace between the identifier and the first, opening, parenthesis.  If whitespace is present, the macro will be interpreted as object-like with everything starting from the first parenthesis added to the token list.

A macro definition can be removed with #undef:
#undef <identifier>                                              // delete the macro

Whenever the identifier appears in the source code it is replaced with the replacement token list, which can be empty.  For an identifier declared to be a function-like macro, it is only replaced when the following token is also a left parenthesis that begins the argument list of the macro invocation.  The exact procedure followed for expansion of function-like macros with arguments is subtle.

Object-like macros were conventionally used as part of good programming practice to create symbolic names for constants, e.g.,

#define PI 3.14159

instead of hard-coding numbers throughout the code. An alternative in both C and C++, especially in situations in which a pointer to the number is required, is to apply the const qualifier to a global variable. This causes the value to be stored in memory, instead of being substituted by the preprocessor.

An example of a function-like macro is:

#define RADTODEG(x) ((x) * 57.29578)

This defines a radians-to-degrees conversion which can be inserted in the code where required, i.e., RADTODEG(34). This is expanded in-place, so that repeated multiplication by the constant is not shown throughout the code. The macro here is written as all uppercase to emphasize that it is a macro, not a compiled function.

The second  is enclosed in its own pair of parentheses to avoid the possibility of incorrect order of operations when it is an expression instead of a single value.

Similarly, the outer pair of parentheses maintain correct order of operation.

Order of expansion 

function-like macro expansion occurs in the following stages:

 Stringification operations are replaced with the textual representation of their argument's replacement list (without performing expansion).
 Parameters are replaced with their replacement list (without performing expansion).
 Concatenation operations are replaced with the concatenated result of the two operands (without expanding the resulting token).
 Tokens originating from parameters are expanded.
 The resulting tokens are expanded as normal.

This may produce surprising results:

#define HE HI
#define LLO _THERE
#define HELLO "HI THERE"
#define CAT(a,b) a##b
#define XCAT(a,b) CAT(a,b)
#define CALL(fn) fn(HE,LLO)
CAT(HE, LLO) // "HI THERE", because concatenation occurs before normal expansion
XCAT(HE, LLO) // HI_THERE, because the tokens originating from parameters ("HE" and "LLO") are expanded first
CALL(CAT) // "HI THERE", because parameters are expanded first

Special macros and directives 

Certain symbols are required to be defined by an implementation during preprocessing. For instance the following:

// debugging macros so we can pin down message origin at a glance
// is bad
#define WHERESTR  "[file %s, line %d]: "
#define WHEREARG  , 
#define DEBUGPRINT2(...)       fprintf(stderr, __VA_ARGS__)
#define DEBUGPRINT(_fmt, ...)  DEBUGPRINT2(WHERESTR _fmt, WHEREARG, __VA_ARGS__)
// OR
// is good
#define DEBUGPRINT(_fmt, ...)  fprintf(stderr, "[file %s, line %d]: " _fmt, __VA_ARGS__)

  DEBUGPRINT("hey, x=%d\n", x);

prints the value of x, preceded by the file and line number to the error stream, allowing quick access to which line the message was produced on. Note that the WHERESTR argument is concatenated with the string following it. The #line directive determines the line number and the file name of the line below. E.g.:

#line 314 "pi.c"
printf("line=%d file=%s\n");

generates the printf function:

printf("line=%d file=%s\n", 314, "pi.c");

This allows source code debugging when C is used as the target language of a compiler, for a totally different language.
The first C Standard specified that the macro  be defined to 1 if the implementation conforms to the ISO Standard and 0 otherwise, and the macro __STDC_VERSION__ defined as a numeric literal specifying the version of the Standard supported by the implementation. Standard C++ compilers support the __cplusplus macro. Compilers running in non-standard mode must not set these macros or must define others to signal the differences.

The second edition of the C Standard, C99, added support for __func__, which contains the name of the function definition within which it is contained, but because the preprocessor is agnostic to the grammar of C, this must be done in the compiler itself using a variable local to the function.

Macros that can take a varying number of arguments (variadic macros) are not allowed in C89, but were introduced by a number of compilers and standardized in C99.  Variadic macros are particularly useful when writing wrappers to functions taking a variable number of parameters, such as printf, for example when logging warnings and errors.

One little-known usage pattern of the C preprocessor is known as X-Macros. An X-Macro is a header file.  Commonly these use the extension ".def" instead of the traditional ".h". This file contains a list of similar macro calls, which can be referred to as "component macros".  The include file is then referenced repeatedly.

Many compilers define additional, non-standard macros, although these are often poorly documented.  A common reference for these macros is the Pre-defined C/C++ Compiler Macros project, which lists "various pre-defined compiler macros that can be used to identify standards, compilers, operating systems, hardware architectures, and even basic run-time libraries at compile-time".

Token stringification 

The # operator (known as the "Stringification Operator") converts a token into a C string literal, escaping any quotes or backslashes appropriately.

Example:

#define str(s) #s

str(p = "foo\n";) // outputs "p = \"foo\\n\";"
str(\n)           // outputs "\n"

If you want to stringify the expansion of a macro argument, you have to use two levels of macros:

#define xstr(s) str(s)
#define str(s) #s
#define foo 4

str (foo)  // outputs "foo"
xstr (foo) // outputs "4"

You cannot combine a macro argument with additional text and stringify it all together. You can however write a series of adjacent string constants and stringified arguments: the C compiler will then combine all the adjacent string constants into one long string.

Token concatenation 

The ## operator (known as the "Token Pasting Operator") concatenates two tokens into one token.

Example:

#define DECLARE_STRUCT_TYPE(name) typedef struct name##_s name##_t

DECLARE_STRUCT_TYPE(g_object); // Outputs: typedef struct g_object_s g_object_t;

User-defined compilation errors 

The #error directive outputs a message through the error stream.

#error "error message"

Implementations 

All C, C++ and Objective-C implementations provide a preprocessor, as preprocessing is a required step for those languages, and its behavior is described by official standards for these languages, such as the ISO C standard.

Implementations may provide their own extensions and deviations, and vary in their degree of compliance with written standards.  Their exact behavior may depend on command-line flags supplied on invocation.  For instance, the GNU C preprocessor can be made more standards compliant by supplying certain flags.

Compiler-specific preprocessor features 

The #pragma directive is a compiler-specific directive, which compiler vendors may use for their own purposes. For instance, a #pragma is often used to allow suppression of specific error messages, manage heap and stack debugging and so on. A compiler with support for the OpenMP parallelization library can automatically parallelize a for loop with #pragma omp parallel for.

C99 introduced a few standard #pragma directives, taking the form #pragma STDC ..., which are used to control the floating-point implementation. The alternative, macro-like form  was also added.

 Many implementations do not support trigraphs or do not replace them by default.
 Many implementations (including, e.g., the C compilers by GNU, Intel, Microsoft and IBM) provide a non-standard directive to print out a warning message in the output, but not stop the compilation process. A typical use is to warn about the usage of some old code, which is now deprecated and only included for compatibility reasons, e.g.:// GNU, Intel and IBM
#warning "Do not use ABC, which is deprecated. Use XYZ instead."// Microsoft
#pragma message("Do not use ABC, which is deprecated. Use XYZ instead.")
 Some Unix preprocessors traditionally provided "assertions", which have little similarity to assertions used in programming.
 GCC provides #include_next for chaining headers of the same name.
 Objective-C preprocessors have #import, which is like #include but only includes the file once. A common vendor pragma with a similar functionality in C is #pragma once.

Other uses 

As the C preprocessor can be invoked separately from the compiler with which it is supplied, it can be used separately, on different languages.  Notable examples include its use in the now-deprecated imake system and for preprocessing Fortran.  However, such use as a general purpose preprocessor is limited: the input language must be sufficiently C-like. The GNU Fortran compiler automatically calls "traditional mode" (see below) cpp before compiling Fortran code if certain file extensions are used. Intel offers a Fortran preprocessor, fpp, for use with the ifort compiler, which has similar capabilities.

CPP also works acceptably with most assembly languages and Algol-like languages. This requires that the language syntax not conflict with CPP syntax, which means no lines starting with # and that double quotes, which cpp interprets as string literals and thus ignores, don't have syntactical meaning other than that. The "traditional mode" (acting like a pre-ISO C preprocessor) is generally more permissive and better suited for such use.

The C preprocessor is not Turing-complete, but it comes very close: recursive computations can be specified, but with a fixed upper bound on the amount of recursion performed. However, the C preprocessor is not designed to be, nor does it perform well as, a general-purpose programming language. As the C preprocessor does not have features of some other preprocessors, such as recursive macros, selective expansion according to quoting, and string evaluation in conditionals, it is very limited in comparison to a more general macro processor such as m4.

See also 
 C syntax
 Make
 Preprocessor
 m4 (computer language)
 PL/I preprocessor

References

Sources

External links 

 ISO/IEC 9899. The official C standard. As of 2014, the latest publicly available version is a working paper for C11.
 GNU CPP online manual
 Visual Studio .NET preprocessor reference
 Pre-defined C/C++ Compiler Macros project: lists "various pre-defined compiler macros that can be used to identify standards, compilers, operating systems, hardware architectures, and even basic run-time libraries at compile-time"

C (programming language)
Transformation languages
Macro programming languages